Riley Ware (born September 19, 1962) is a former American football defensive back who played five seasons in the Arena Football League with the Cincinnati Rockers, Orlando Predators, Massachusetts Marauders, St. Louis Stampede and Charlotte Rage. He played college football at Western Kentucky University.

References

External links
Just Sports Stats

Living people
1962 births
Players of American football from Florida
American football defensive backs
African-American players of American football
Western Kentucky Hilltoppers football players
Cincinnati Rockers players
Orlando Predators players
Massachusetts Marauders players
St. Louis Stampede players
Charlotte Rage players
People from Fort Myers, Florida
21st-century African-American people
20th-century African-American sportspeople